Downpour may refer to:
Heavy rain
Downpour (film), 1971 film by Bahram Beyzai
Downpour (album), a 1999 music album by Mannafest
"Downpour", a song from Unbreakable (Backstreet Boys album)
"Downpour (I.O.I song)", a song from Korean Girl Group I.O.I
A fictional superhero in the animated series Justice League Unlimited based on the character Zan
Silent Hill: Downpour, the eighth installment in video game series Silent Hill
"Northern Downpour", the fourth and final single from Panic! at the Disco's second album, Pretty. Odd.